Social-Demokraten (The Social Democrat) was a Swedish newspaper published from 1885 to 1944. 

Social-Demokraten could also refer to: 

Social-Demokraten (Chicago newspaper), a Norwegian- and Danish-language newspaper published in the United States from 1911 to 1921
Dagsavisen, a Norwegian newspaper that was named Social-Demokraten from 1886 to 1923

See also
Social democracy
Social Democrats (disambiguation)